Lycée Les Pierres Vives is a senior high school/sixth form college in Carrières-sur-Seine, Yvelines, France, in the Paris metropolitan area.

In 2016–2017, 1474 students were attending the high school, for a capacity of 1200 students.

References

External links
 Lycée Les Pierres Vives 

Lycées in Yvelines